is a Japanese singer, actress, and television presenter. She made her debut in 2000 in Taiwan as part of the girls group Sunday Girls, and has concentrated her activities in Taiwan since then. She is capable of speaking both Japanese and Mandarin, and had appeared in a number of commercials, programs, and television dramas. She is also the vocalist of the Mandarin pop band Da Mouth, which was formed in November 2007.

Career
Senda was born and raised in Ginowan, Okinawa, Japan, where she had been attending Okinawa Actors School since the age of nine. In 2000, after the unexpected departure of Ando Yuko from Super Sunday, a popular television program in Taiwan, Senda was brought in to fill the opened spot. She and three other girls later formed Sunday Girls, and released their only album Xi-huan-ni (Chinese:喜歡你) which contains both Japanese and Mandarin songs. The group disbanded in 2001.

Since leaving Super Sunday, she had appeared on a number of variety shows, as well as several commercials. She made her debut on television dramas when she was cast in Meteor Rain, the sequel of the famous drama Meteor Garden among F4..

She joined Da Mouth in 2007 as their female vocalist, and released their first album Da Mouth in November 2007.

On 18 November 2018, she released her solo single, "梭哈 -So Hot-" with Kai under label JSJ Music.

Discography

Singles

Albums

Filmography

Television series

External links
Da Mouth official site
Senda Aisa's blog

People from Okinawa Prefecture
Living people
1982 births
Musicians from Okinawa Prefecture
Japanese actresses
Japanese television presenters
Mandopop singers
21st-century Japanese singers
21st-century Japanese women singers
Japanese women television presenters
Japanese expatriates in Taiwan
Ryukyuan people